Israel sent a delegation to compete at the 1976 Summer Paralympics in Toronto, Ontario, Canada. Its athletes finished third in the overall medal count.

References 

Nations at the 1976 Summer Paralympics
1976
Summer Paralympics